Michaël Goossens (born 30 November 1973) is a Belgian retired footballer who played as a striker.

Club career
Born in Ougrée, Seraing, Goossens started playing professionally with R.F.C. Seraing at the age of 16, then moved to Standard Liège. In the 1992–93 campaign he won the Young Professional Footballer of the Year award whilst, alongside Philippe Léonard and Régis Genaux, being part of The Three Musketeers generation (with Roberto Bisconti playing a smaller role), hailed for their sporting talent but with a troublesome character.

In September 1996, after helping Standard to two league runner-up places and the 1993 Belgian Cup, Goossens signed for Genoa C.F.C. in Italy, but only lasted there one season, as the Liguria team failed to promote from Serie B. In the following three years, he played in Germany with FC Schalke 04, being used sparingly during his spell and sharing team with compatriots Nico van Kerckhoven (two years) and Marc Wilmots (three).

With the Gelsenkirchen club, Goossens notably scored in the quarterfinals of the 1997–98 UEFA Cup against Inter Milan, but the defending champions were eventually ousted after losing 1–0 away and a 1–1 home draw; with three goals, he was the best scorer in European competition for Schalke, but only netted five times in two-and-a-half seasons combined in the Bundesliga.

In the 2000 January transfer window Goossens returned to Standard, exchanged for compatriot Émile Mpenza. He helped the team reach the final of the cup in 2000, regaining his previous form and scoring more than 40 official goals.

Goossens then moved abroad again, aged nearly 30, spending one season in Austria with Grazer AK, who won the first – and only – double in its history, finishing one point ahead of FK Austria Wien which were also the losing side in the domestic cup.

Subsequently, he returned home and played one year for K. Sint-Truidense VV, coached by former Standard and Schalke teammate Wilmots. Until his 2007 retirement, he would play in the lower and amateur leagues.

International career
Goossens first played with Belgium on 13 February 1993 (aged 19), in a 3–0 win in Cyprus for the 1994 FIFA World Cup qualifiers, entering the field after 87 minutes. In the following eight years he won a further 13 caps, scoring once against Germany.

Like Genaux and Léonard, Goossens would miss the final cuts after appearing during the qualifying stages, for three World Cups – 1994, 1998 and 2002 – not being selected for UEFA Euro 2000 due to injury.

Honours

Club 

 Standard Liège

 Belgian Cup: 1992–93 (winners), 1999-2000 (finalists)
Intertoto Cup: 1996 (runners-up)

Grazer AK 

 Austrian Bundesliga: 2003-04
 Austrian Cup: 2003-04
 Austrian SuperCup: 2004

Individual

Player 

 Young Professional Footballer of the Year: 1992-93

References

External links
Stats at Voetbal International 

1973 births
Living people
People from Seraing
Belgian footballers
Association football forwards
Belgian Pro League players
Challenger Pro League players
R.F.C. Seraing (1904) players
Standard Liège players
Sint-Truidense V.V. players
K.A.S. Eupen players
Serie B players
Genoa C.F.C. players
Bundesliga players
FC Schalke 04 players
Austrian Football Bundesliga players
Grazer AK players
Belgium youth international footballers
Belgium under-21 international footballers
Belgium international footballers
Belgian expatriate footballers
Expatriate footballers in Italy
Expatriate footballers in Germany
Expatriate footballers in Austria
Belgian expatriate sportspeople in Germany
R.F.C. Tilleur players
Footballers from Liège Province